The 21st South East Asian Junior and Cadet Table Tennis Championships 2015 were held in Kuala Lumpur, Malaysia.

Medal summary

Events

Medal table

See also

2015 World Junior Table Tennis Championships
2015 Asian Junior and Cadet Table Tennis Championships
Asian Table Tennis Union

References

South East Asian Table Tennis Championships
South East Asian Junior and Cadet Table Tennis Championships
South East Asian Junior and Cadet Table Tennis Championships
South East Asian Junior and Cadet Table Tennis Championships
Table tennis competitions in Malaysia
International sports competitions hosted by Malaysia
South East Asian Junior and Cadet Table Tennis Championships